Eye in the Labyrinth is a 1972 giallo film directed by Mario Caiano and starring Rosemary Dexter, Sybil Danning, Alida Valli, and Adolfo Celi.

Plot
Julie (Rosemary Dexter) is disturbed by the disappearance of her psychiatrist boyfriend Luca (Horst Frank) following a bizarre dream where she witnessed him murdered.  She travels to a seaside village where he might be and encounters Frank (Adolfo Celi), who tells her Luca has indeed been there.  Julie's investigation leads her to the house of Gerta (Alida Valli), where the mystery deepens among the odd characters residing at this artists enclave.

Cast
 Rosemary Dexter - Julie
 Adolfo Celi - Frank
 Alida Valli - Gerda
 Horst Frank - Luca
 Sybil Danning - Toni
 Franco Ressel - Eugene
 Michael Maien - Louis
 Benjamin Lev - Saro
 Gigi Rizzi - Thomas
 Peter Kranz
 Gaetano Donati
 Elisa Mainardi - Orphanage Director

Release
Eye in the Labyrinth was released on 24 March 1972 in West Germany.

References

Sources

External links

1972 films
West German films
1970s Italian-language films
Giallo films
Films directed by Mario Caiano
1970s Italian films